Mohammed Salih Ali Soulah (born 29 July 1993) is a Libyan professional footballer who plays as a winger for Kuwaiti club Al Arabi Kuwaiti.

Career statistics

Club

Notes

International

References

1993 births
Living people
Libyan footballers
Libya international footballers
Libyan expatriate footballers
Association football midfielders
Al-Muharraq SC players
Riffa SC players
CS Sfaxien players
Expatriate footballers in Bahrain
Expatriate footballers in Tunisia
Libyan expatriate sportspeople in Tunisia
Libyan expatriate sportspeople in Kuwait
Expatriate footballers in Kuwait
Libyan expatriate sportspeople in Bahrain